The Tes River (Mongolian: Тэс гол;) is a river in northwestern Mongolia and southern Tuva, Russia. Its spring is in Tsagaan-Uul sum in Khövsgöl. The river then flows through Zavkhan (Mongolia), Tuva (Russia), next back to Uvs (Mongolia) before entering Uvs Lake. While in Khövsgöl, there is a wooden bridge near Tsetserleg and a concrete bridge near Bayantes on the road to Kyzyl, Russia. 

The Tes River is primary source of the Uvs Lake. A large section of the river, from where it enters the Uvs Province to its mound in the lake, is included in the Uvs Nuur Basin UNESCO World Heritage Site.

References

See also 
 List of rivers of Mongolia

Rivers of Mongolia
Rivers of Tuva
International rivers of Asia
Khövsgöl Province
Endorheic basins of Asia